Swimming, for the 2015 Island Games, took place at the Les Quennevais Sports Centre and Playing Fields in Saint Brélade, Jersey. Competition took place from 29 to 2 July 2015. The events were held in a short course (25 m) pool.

Medal table

Medal summary of events

Men's events

Women's events

References

2015 Island Games
2015 in swimming
2015